Spydeberg Station is located in Spydeberg, Norway on the Østfold Line. The railway station is served by the Oslo Commuter Rail line L22 from Oslo Central Station. The station was opened in 1882.

Railway stations in Østfold
Railway stations on the Østfold Line
Railway stations opened in 1882
1882 establishments in Norway
Spydeberg